Limeking is a village the headquarters of an eponymous Circle in the Upper Subansiri district in  Arunachal Pradesh, India.  The village is about 143 kilometers from the district headquarters.

Map

References

Villages in Upper Subansiri district